is a Japanese manga artist, most famous for his characterizations and stories set in the world of Tenchi Muyo!.

Okuda got his start as a doujinshi artist before debuting professionally, studying under Nobuteru Yūki and Yutaka Izubuchi.

His collection of Tenchi-related works spans eleven years, beginning with "No Need for Tenchi!" in 1994 before finishing its run as "The All-New Tenchi Muyō!" ("Shin Tenchi Muyō!") in late 2005. "Tenchi, Heaven Forbid! G...", a collection of seventy-four yonkoma comics drawn during the course of six years for Pioneer LDC's monthly fan club letter, was later released by VIZ Media as "Tenchi Muyō: Sasami Stories", bundled along with previously published material featuring the Sasami character.

Works 
  (1990)
 No Need for Tenchi! (1994–2000)
 The All-New Tenchi Muyō! (2000–2005)
 Tenchi Muyō! Sasami Stories (2002)
Tenchi, Heaven Forbid! G... (1994–2000)
 Detatoko Princess (1994–1999)
  (1999-2001)
 Nanana's Buried Treasure (2012-2013)

References

External links
 Hitoshi Okuda  manga works at Media Arts Database 

Tenchi Muyo!
Living people
1963 births
Manga artists from Akita Prefecture
People from Daisen, Akita
Komazawa University alumni